Ferdynand Zarzycki (1888, in Tarnów – 1958, in Chicago, Illinois) was a Polish general and politician. He fought in the Polish Legions in World War I. From 1933 to 1934, he was a Minister of Trade and Industry in the Polish government. He retired in 1934.

1888 births
1958 deaths
Politicians from Tarnów
Polish Austro-Hungarians
People from the Kingdom of Galicia and Lodomeria
Polish generals
Polish legionnaires (World War I)
Polish people of the Polish–Ukrainian War
Polish people of the Polish–Soviet War
Polish politicians
Recipients of the Order of the Star of Romania